Agave macroacantha, the black-spined agave or large-thorned agave, is a species of succulent flowering plant in the family Asparagaceae naturally occurring in Oaxaca and also near the town of Tehuacan in the State of Puebla, Mexico.

Description
Agave macroacantha produces a medium-sized leaf rosette that can be basal or can grow on a very short stem. Leaves are succulent, greyish green and up to 1.8 feet long at a maximum, ending in sharp black spines that are up to 1.2 inches long at the tips. Flowers are small, grey and red, growing in bunches on sturdy stems of up to 3 m (10 feet) in height.

Cultivation
The plant prefers a dry, sunny and hot location for summer and from early autumn onwards a cooler, well-lit space. It likes regular watering in summer and only minimum watering in winter, and will fare well in a large pot with sparse, gravelly soil.

In the UK this plant has gained the Royal Horticultural Society’s Award of Garden Merit.

References

The Complete Encyclopedia of Succulents by Zdenek Jezek and Libor Kunte

macroacantha
Endemic flora of Mexico
Flora of Oaxaca
Flora of Puebla
Garden plants of North America
Drought-tolerant plants